Matuga is a settlement and Sub-County in Kwale County, Kenya.

References 

Populated places in Coast Province
Kwale County